Thomas Augustus Long (June 1, 1890 – June 23, 1972), was a professional baseball outfielder in the Major Leagues from –. He played for the Washington Senators and St. Louis Cardinals.

In 418 games over five seasons, Long posted a .269 batting average (401-for-1489) with 148 runs, 6 home runs and 140 RBI. He finished his career with a .928 fielding percentage at all three outfield positions. In , he led the National League in triples with 25.

See also
 List of Major League Baseball annual triples leaders

External links

1890 births
1972 deaths
People from Clarke County, Alabama
Major League Baseball outfielders
Baseball players from Alabama
Washington Senators (1901–1960) players
St. Louis Cardinals players
Mobile Sea Gulls players
Atlanta Crackers players
Vernon Tigers players
Shreveport Gassers players
Denver Bears players
Albany Senators players
Springfield Ponies players